Howard Carson can refer to:
 Howard W. Carson (1910–1994), West Virginian state senator
 Howard Carson (American football) (1957–2021), American football linebacker
 Howard Carson Graham (1899–1959), Canadian physician